Vietnam competed at the 2009 World Championships in Athletics from 15–23 August. A team of 2 athletes was announced in preparation for the competition.

Results
Field events

Key
Note–Ranks given for track events are within the athlete's heat only
Q = Qualified for the next round
q = Qualified for the next round as a fastest loser or, in field events, by position without achieving the qualifying target
NR = National record
PB = Personal best
N/A = Round not applicable for the event
Bye = Athlete not required to compete in round

Team selection
Field and combined events

References
Entry list. European Athletic Association (2009-07-30). Retrieved on 2009-08-16.

External links
Official competition website

Nations at the 2009 World Championships in Athletics
World Championships in Athletics
Vietnam at the World Championships in Athletics